gwrite was an open-source styled text word processor for Linux. It uses a GTK+ interface and saves files in HTML5+CSS format. Images can be embedded using base64 encoding. It was available for installation in the Ubuntu and Debian repositories.

Features include:
 Word count
 Save to Microsoft Word container format, HTML5 format, or plain text format without formatting
 Search and Replace

External links
 Project home page
 Tutorial

Free text editors
Unix text editors
Linux text editors
Free software programmed in Python
Text editors
Free word processors
Linux word processors
Office software that uses GTK
Automated WYSIWYG editors
Free HTML editors
HTML editors